Benjamín Labatut (born 1980) is a Chilean writer.

Early life 
Labatut was born in Rotterdam, Netherlands. He spent his childhood in The Hague, Buenos Aires, and Lima. He moved to Santiago, at the age of 14.

Writing
Labatut's first book of stories, La Antártica empieza aquí, won the Premio Caza de Letras 2009, awarded by UNAM and Alfaguara in Mexico. It also won the Santiago Municipal Literature Award in the short story category in 2013. His second book, Después de la luz, came out in 2016, followed by Un verdor terrible, which was published in English by Pushkin Press and nominated for the 2021 International Booker Prize.

One of his main literary references was the Chilean poet Samir Nazal, whom he met in 2005 and who acted as a mentor during his early days. Nazal aided him during the writing of the first book he published, Antarctica Starts Here, a collection of seven stories. Other influences he has recognized include Pascal Quignard, Eliot Weinberger, William Burroughs, Roberto Bolaño, and W. G. Sebald.

When We Cease to Understand the World

Labatut's third book, When We Cease to Understand the World, was published in 2020 by Pushkin Press. He said that "it is a book made up by an essay (which is not chemically pure), two stories that try not to be stories, a short novel, and a semi-biographical prose piece." 

Ricardo Baixera, a literary critic for El Periódico, maintained that it was a "very strange fiction that from the first page questions the parameters of reality, and what we understand by literature." John Banville, who described the book in The Guardian as "ingenious, intricate and deeply disturbing", said that the book "could be defined as a non-fiction novel".

Roberto Careaga, a journalist from El Mercurio argued that the author follows "those scientists who captivated him, but it is not a collection of biographies: intense and variegated, it is a volume of stories strung along the brilliant paths of 20th-century science that ended in the unknown and sometimes in pure darkness. They refer to real events, but Labatut ... adds a dose of essay and also fiction".

Ruth Franklin, writing in The New Yorker, argued that

When We Cease to Understand the World has been translated into 22 languages by publishers from Germany, China, the United States, France, Holland, England, and Italy. The English edition of the book was shortlisted for the International Booker Prize in 2021, and in July 2021, Barack Obama included the book in his last reading list for the summer, which Obama shared on his Twitter account. It was selected for the New York Times Book Reviews "10 Best Books of 2021" list.

References

Chilean male novelists
Chilean male short story writers
21st-century Chilean novelists
21st-century Chilean male writers
1980 births
Chilean people of French descent
Living people
21st-century Chilean short story writers
Metaphysical fiction novels